Demonic, daemonic or dæmonic may refer to:

 Demon, a supernatural and often malevolent being prevalent historically in religion, occultism, literature, fiction, mythology, and folklore
 Daemon (classical mythology), a lesser deity or guiding spirit such as the daemons of ancient Greek religion and mythology and of later Hellenistic religion and philosophy
 Demonic (album), a 1997 album by American thrash metal band Testament
 Demonic (2015 film), an American supernatural horror film
 Demonic (2021 film), a Canadian supernatural horror film
 Demonic or Johannes Roberts' Demonic, US title for the 2005 British film, Forest of the Damned directed by Johannes Roberts

See also
 Daimonic, a religious, philosophical, psychological and literary concept
 Demon (disambiguation)